The 55 Day War occurred in Angola, following the 1992 elections, when the city of Huambo was disrupted by a confrontation between the People's Movement for the Liberation of Angola (MPLA) and National Union for the Total Independence of Angola (UNITA). The war lasted 55 days, beginning on 9 January 1993.

Over those days, the city was destroyed and lay in ruins. Few prisoners were taken. Wounded civilians and soldiers were left in the streets to die.

After 55 days of urban warfare, UNITA held the city. 

During the conflict, the MPLA lost 40 tanks and most of its artillery and small arms were captured. UNITA claims that MPLA's casualties were 12,000. Other estimates of casualties totaled 12,000 to 15,000 with 5,000 being civilians.

See also
 Angolan Civil War
 1992 Angolan legislative election
 1992 Angolan presidential election

References 

Bibliography

Further reading 
"The battle for Huambo" 1993, Economist, 326, 7801, pp. 43–45.
"Fingers crossed" 1994, Economist, 333, 7893, p. 44.
"The ruins of rebellion" 1994, Economist, 330, 7852, pp. 44–45.

Angolan Civil War
Huambo
1993 in Angola
Conflicts in 1993
Wars involving Angola
MPLA
UNITA